Saleh Al-Qobaissi (born 6 November 1964) is a Saudi Arabian former cyclist. He competed in two events at the 1992 Summer Olympics.

References

1964 births
Living people
Saudi Arabian male cyclists
Olympic cyclists of Saudi Arabia
Cyclists at the 1992 Summer Olympics
Place of birth missing (living people)